John Roberts  (born 1858) was a Welsh international footballer. He was part of the Wales national football team between 1881 and 1882, playing 2 matches. He played his first match on 14 March 1881 against Scotland and his last match on 25 March 1882 against Scotland.

See also
 List of Wales international footballers (alphabetical)

References

1858 births
Welsh footballers
Wales international footballers
Place of birth missing
Year of death missing
Association footballers not categorized by position